Said Khatibi is an Algerian writer. He was born in 1984 and studied at the University of Algiers and at the Sorbonne. His books include the following titles:
The Book of Faults (kitab al-khataya), novel, 2013
The Gardens of the East Afflamed (jana’in al-sharq al-multahiba), travel in the Balkans, 2015
Forty Years Waiting for Isabel, novel, 2016
Firewood of Sarajevo, novel, 2018

Firewood of Sarajevo was nominated for the Arabic Booker Prize. Forty Years Waiting for Isabel was translated into Spanish by Noemi Fierro Bandera. Khatibi has also translated the poetry of Kateb Yacine, and a volume of Algerian short stories into French.

He lives in Slovenia.

References

Algerian writers
1984 births
Living people
21st-century Algerian people